Bülent is a Turkish masculine given name and a family name meaning "tall" and "high", from Persian boland which means tall or high. The equivalent form in Azeri is Bülənd. It may refer to:

Bülend
Bulend Biščević (born 1975), Bosnian footballer
Bülend Özveren (1943–2022), Turkish television presenter and sports commentator
Bülend Ulusu (1923–2015), Turkish admiral and former prime minister

Bülent

Bülent Akın, Belgian-Turkish footballer
Bülent Arel, Turkish-born composer
Bülent Arınç, Turkish politician of renowned oratory
Bülent Atalay, Turkish-American author, scientist, and artist
Bülent Ataman, Turkish footballer
Bülent Bezdüz, Turkish tenor
Bülent Çetinaslan, Turkish actor
Bülent Ceylan, German comedian 
Bülent Çetin (born 1985), Turkish amputee football player
Bülent Ecevit, Turkish politician, poet, writer and journalist
Bülent Eczacıbaşı, Turkish billionaire businessman and philanthropist
Bülent Eken, Turkish footballer and coach
Bülent Ersoy, Turkish singer
Bülent Ertuğrul, Turkish footballer
Bülent Evcil, Turkish flutist
Bülent Kayabaş, Turkish actor 
Bülent Kocabey, Turkish footballer
Bülent Korkmaz, Turkish footballer and coach
Bülent Korkmaz (archer) (born 1975), Turkish Paralympian archer
Bülent Ortaçgil, Turkish composer and singer
Bülent Özcan, Turkish Poet
Bulent Rauf, Turkish-British mystic, spiritual teacher, translator, and author
Bülent Şenver (born 1950), Turkish banker and lecturer
Bülent Uygun, Turkish footballer and coach
Bülent Uzun, Turkish footballer
Bülent Üçüncü, Turkish-French footballer
Bülent Ünder, Turkish football manager
Bülent Yıldırım (referee), Turkish football referee
Fehmi Bülent Yıldırım (born 1966), Turkish Muslim activist

Turkish masculine given names